WNUX is a Catholic Religious formatted broadcast radio station licensed to Montgomery, West Virginia, serving the Beckley/Oak Hill area.  WNUX is owned and operated by The Saint Thomas More Catholic Lawyers Society, Inc.

References

External links
 

2012 establishments in West Virginia
Catholic radio stations
Radio stations established in 2012
NUX